Cheilosia fraterna is a Palearctic hoverfly.

Description
A Cheilosia with dark eye hairs, glossed sternites and a low facial prominence

The larva is described and figured by Rotheray  (1994).

Distribution and biology
It is found  from  Fenno-Scandia south to the Pyrenees (montane in southern parts of its
range) and from Britain eastwards through Central Europe into European Russia and on into much of Siberia. 
The habitat is deciduous forest of Quercus and Fagus along streams and rivers. Flowers visited include Caltha, Ranunculus, Stellaria, Taraxacum.Flies from April to June (at higher altitudes July to September. The larva mines Cirsium palustre and species of Carduus.

References

External links
 Images representing Cheilosia fraterna

Diptera of Europe
Eristalinae
Insects described in 1830